Jalalabad is a village in the Gujranwala District of Punjab, Pakistan. It is located at 31°55'27N 73°51'52E, and has an altitude of 209 metres (688 feet).

References

Villages in Gujranwala District